Bry is the surname of:

 Benoît Bry, French water polo player
 Dave Bry (1970-2017), American writer
 Barbara Bry (born 1950), American entrepreneur
 Ellen Bry (born 1951), American actress
 Fabrice Bry (born 1972), French volleyball player
 Lynn Bry, American scientist
 Knut Bry (born 1946), Norwegian photographer

See also
 De Bry, another surname